Yao Xueyin (10 October 1910 – 29 April 1999) was a Chinese novelist who was a member of China Writers Association. Yao was a member of the 5th, 6th, and 7th National Committee of the Chinese People's Political Consultative Conference. Yao used his fortune posthumously to institute the Yao Xueyin Historical Novel Prize.

Biography
Yao was born into a family of landlord background in Dengzhou, Henan in 1910. In 1930, Yao was expelled for taking part in student movement from Henan University. In 1940s, Yao started to write the novel Li Zicheng.

In 1950s. Yao worked in Wuhan, and shortly taught at Central China Normal University. 
In 1957, Yao was labeled as a rightist by the government and he was sent to a farm to work. In 1961, he was rehabilitated by Mao Zedong, and he returned to Wuhan.

In 1963, Yao published his novel Li Zicheng volume 1 by the China Youth Publishing House.

During the Cultural Revolution, his novel Li Zicheng was denounced as a "giant poisonous weed". He was attacked by the Red Guards, but was protected from physical harm by Mao Zedong.

In 1977, Yao published his novel Li Zicheng volume 2, which won him the first-time Mao Dun Literature Prize, a prestigious literary award in China.

In 1999, Yao died in Beijing Fuxing Hospital.

Works

Novellas
 Niu Quande and his Carrots

Long novels
 Li Zicheng volume 1
 Li Zicheng volume 2
 Li Zicheng volume 3
 Li Zicheng volume 4
 Li Zicheng volume 5
 When Spring Comes
 A Long Night

Personal life
At the age of 21, Yao married Wang Meicai. The couple had four children (three sons and one daughter).

Sons:
 Yao Haiyun
 Yao Haixing
 Yao Haitian

Daughter:
 Yao Haiyan

References

Writers from Nanyang, Henan
People from Dengzhou
1910 births
1999 deaths
Academic staff of the Central China Normal University
20th-century novelists
Mao Dun Literature Prize laureates
Chinese male novelists
20th-century Chinese male writers
Victims of the Anti-Rightist Campaign
Educators from Henan
Republic of China novelists
People's Republic of China novelists